Nicholas Francis may refer to:

 Nicholas Francis, Duke of Lorraine (1609–1670)
 Nicholas Francis (judge) (born 1958)

See also